Marek Jarolím (born 21 May 1984) is a former Czech football midfielder who currently is the head coach of SK Slavia Prague's B-team.

Career

Club career
In March 2013, Jarolím signed for Chinese Super League club Hangzhou Greentown. After leaving China, he started training for Slavia Prague and was engaged in negotiations for returning to his former club. Shortly afterwards, on 6 September 2013, he signed for Greek Football League club Iraklis. He made his debut for his new club in an away 3–2 loss against Kavala. His first goal for Iraklis came in a home win against Anagennisi Giannitsa. On 18 January 2014, his contract with Iraklis was terminated by mutual consent. In total, he made eight appearances for the club and scored three goals. On 21 January 2014, Jarolím signed a contract with Czech First League side Slovan Liberec.

Coaching career 
In the summer of 2017 Jarolím joined the Slavia Prague U17 team as assistant coach. In June 2020, he was promoted to head coach of Slavia's B-team.

Personal
He is a nephew of Karel Jarolím, a Czech football coach, and a cousin of Lukáš Jarolím and David Jarolím.

Honours

Club
 Slavia Prague
 Czech First League:
Winner (2): 2007–08, 2008–09

 Jablonec
 Czech First League:
Runner-up (1): 2009–10
 Czech Cup:
Runner-up (1):2009–10

References

External links
 
 
 

1984 births
Living people
Czech footballers
Czech Republic under-21 international footballers
Czech First League players
Chinese Super League players
Football League (Greece) players
SK Slavia Prague players
FK Mladá Boleslav players
FC Viktoria Plzeň players
FK Jablonec players
FK Teplice players
FC Slovan Liberec players
Zhejiang Professional F.C. players
Iraklis Thessaloniki F.C. players
Czech expatriate footballers
Expatriate footballers in China
Expatriate footballers in Greece
Sportspeople from Olomouc
Association football midfielders
Bohemians 1905 players
SK Slavia Prague non-playing staff